Union Community Hospital is a historic hospital building for African-American patients during segregation located at Union, Union County, South Carolina.  The front section was built about 1915 as a frame residence, and is a two-story building on which a brick veneer was placed in the 1930s, with Neo-Classical style design elements. The brick rear section was added in 1949.  The Union Community Hospital was founded in December 1932, and provided services to the African-American community of Union County for 43 years.

It was added to the National Register of Historic Places in 1996.

References

Hospital buildings on the National Register of Historic Places in South Carolina
Neoclassical architecture in South Carolina
Buildings and structures completed in 1949
Buildings and structures in Union County, South Carolina
National Register of Historic Places in Union County, South Carolina
Historically black hospitals in the United States
Hospitals established in 1915
Hospitals in South Carolina